ŽRK Rudar Labin is a  Croatian women's handball club based in Labin. It was established in 1954. It plays in the 2. HRL West.
Several notable players from the club went on the play for the national team, both Croatia's and Yugoslavia's.

The players are nicknamed the swans.

History
In 1964 the club reached for the first time the playoffs to the first Yugoslav league. In 1966, Rudar reached the playoffs again, but was eliminated by Rijeka's Zamet. In 1974 they reached the finals of the Croatian Cup, eliminating Zagreb's Lokomotiva. In 1976, the youth team won the Croatian championship. The first team won the title of second league champions in 1976/77, won the qualifications in Belgrade and thus reached Yugoslavia's first league. This is the greatest success for Labin in handball, and one of Istria's greatest achievements in sports.

In the 1981/82 season they won the Yugoslavian second league, losing only one game when they were already qualified, and thus were promoted to the first league. In the 1982/83 season they finished 7th in Yugoslavia's first league, although they were fourth for most of the season.

Sporting achievements

Domestic competitions
Yugoslav first league
 7th place: 1982/83

Yugoslav second league
 Winners (2): 1976/77, 1981/82

Yugoslav Championship (U-20)
 Winners (3): 1976, 1977, 1982
 3rd place: 1975

Yugoslav Cup (U-20)
 Quarter-finals: 1975

Croatian Championship (U-20) 
 Winners (4): 1975, 1976

Croatian Cup (U-20)
 Runners-up: 1976

International competitions
Adriatic Cup (U-20)
 Winners (2): 1973, 1974
 Runners-up (2): 1975

Notable former players 
Notable former players of the club include the following.
 Doris Belušić
 Lorena Beučić
 Ivona Bućan
 Denis Čalović
 Evelina Galo
 Suzana Golja
 Čeda Hrvatin
 Sabina Ibrahimović
 Maja Jusić
 Tamara Klapčić
 Žana Kljajić
 Karmen Kokot
 Tea Linić
 Sara Mileta
 Hermina Mrkaljević
 Loredana Paliska
 Ornela Paliska
 Adriana Prosenjak
 Gordana Salopek
 Suzana Špoljarić
 Virna Šumberac
 Eni Šverko
 Ksenija Vozila
 Ingrid Zulijani

See also
 RK Rudar Labin
 MRK Rudar Labin

References

External links
 

Croatian handball clubs
Volleyball clubs established in 1947
Labin
1954 establishments in Croatia
Women's sports teams in Croatia
Women's handball clubs
Women's handball in Croatia